Pruning is a data compression technique in machine learning and search algorithms that reduces the size of decision trees by removing sections of the tree that are non-critical and redundant to classify instances. Pruning reduces the complexity of the final classifier, and hence improves predictive accuracy by the reduction of overfitting.

One of the questions that arises in a decision tree algorithm is the optimal size of the final tree.  A tree that is too large risks overfitting the training data and poorly generalizing to new samples.  A small tree might not capture important structural information about the sample space.  However, it is hard to tell when a tree algorithm should stop because it is impossible to tell if the addition of a single extra node will dramatically decrease error.  This problem is known as the horizon effect.  A common strategy is to grow the tree until each node contains a small number of instances then use pruning to remove nodes that do not provide additional information.

Pruning should reduce the size of a learning tree without reducing predictive accuracy as measured by a cross-validation set.  There are many techniques for tree pruning that differ in the measurement that is used to optimize performance.

Techniques
Pruning processes can be divided into two types (pre- and post-pruning).

Pre-pruning procedures prevent a complete induction of the training set by replacing a stop criterion in the induction algorithm (e.g. max. Tree depth or information gain (Attr)> minGain). Pre-pruning methods are considered to be more efficient because they do not induce an entire set, but rather trees remain small from the start. Prepruning methods share a common problem, the horizon effect. This is to be understood as the undesired premature termination of the induction by the stop criterion.

Post-pruning (or just pruning) is the most common way of simplifying trees. Here, nodes and subtrees are replaced with leaves to reduce complexity. Pruning can not only significantly reduce the size but also improve the classification accuracy of unseen objects. It may be the case that the accuracy of the assignment on the train set deteriorates, but the accuracy of the classification properties of the tree increases overall.

The procedures are differentiated on the basis of their approach in the tree (top-down or bottom-up).

Bottom-up pruning 
These procedures start at the last node in the tree (the lowest point). Following recursively upwards, they determine the relevance of each individual node. If the relevance for the classification is not given, the node is dropped or replaced by a leaf. The advantage is that no relevant sub-trees can be lost with this method.
These methods include Reduced Error Pruning (REP), Minimum Cost Complexity Pruning (MCCP), or Minimum Error Pruning (MEP).

Top-down pruning 
In contrast to the bottom-up method, this method starts at the root of the tree. Following the structure below, a relevance check is carried out which decides whether a node is relevant for the classification of all n items or not. By pruning the tree at an inner node, it can happen that an entire sub-tree (regardless of its relevance) is dropped. One of these representatives is pessimistic error pruning (PEP), which brings quite good results with unseen items.

Pruning algorithms

Reduced error pruning
One of the simplest forms of pruning is reduced error pruning.  Starting at the leaves, each node is replaced with its most popular class.  If the prediction accuracy is not affected then the change is kept.  While somewhat naive, reduced error pruning has the advantage of simplicity and speed.

Cost complexity pruning
At step , the tree is created by removing a subtree from tree  and replacing it with a leaf node with value chosen as in the tree building algorithm. The subtree that is removed is chosen as follows:
 The subtree  that minimizes  is chosen for removal.
The function  defines the tree obtained by pruning the subtrees  from the tree .  Once the series of trees has been created, the best tree is chosen by generalized accuracy as measured by a training set or cross-validation.

See also
 Alpha–beta pruning
 Artificial neural network
 Null-move heuristic

References

Further reading
 MDL based decision tree pruning
 Decision tree pruning using backpropagation neural networks

External links
 Fast, Bottom-Up Decision Tree Pruning Algorithm
 Introduction to Decision tree pruning

Decision trees 
Machine learning